Charles Henry (5 July 1911 – 4 June 1989) was a Liberal party member of the House of Commons of Canada. He was born in Toronto, Ontario.

After studies for a Bachelor of Arts degree at St. Michael's College, he became a barrister and lawyer.

He was first elected at the Rosedale riding in the 1949 general election, defeating Tory incumbent Harry Jackman, and was then re-elected in 1953. Henry was defeated in the 1957 election by David James Walker of the Progressive Conservative party.

References

External links
 

1911 births
1989 deaths
20th-century Canadian lawyers
Lawyers in Ontario
Liberal Party of Canada MPs
Members of the House of Commons of Canada from Ontario
Politicians from Toronto
University of Toronto alumni